Douglas James Dailey MBE (born 1944) is an English racing cyclist, former national road race champion and the former logistics manager of British Cycling. He has also been the national coach and an administrator.

Biography
Dailey was born in Orrell Park, Liverpool. He represented his country on many occasions including several editions of the Tour of Britain. He received the Merseyside Golden Cycle award in 1969 and 1984. He retired from competition in 1986 after 26 years and became national coach for 10 years. After a brief break he returned as logistics manager. Dailey is also former manager of Kirkby Sports Centre. He lives in Ruthin, North Wales.

Dailey was logistics coordinator at the Summer Olympics for the third time in 2008, he ensured all British Cycling's kit, scientific equipment, medical back-up and the athletes themselves arrived safely in Beijing. Dailey began sending equipment out three months earlier, in May, to ensure everything ran smoothly. Dailey was made an MBE for services to sport in the Queen's New Year Honours list in 2008. In 2009, he was inducted into the British Cycling Hall of Fame. Dailey is credited with discovering several important British cyclists, including Chris Froome.

Palmarès

1963
1st Mersey Roads Two Day

1967
1st Mersey Roads Two Day
1969
Winner of Raleigh Dunlop Tour of Ireland, while riding with Kirkby CC
1972
1st  British National Road Race Championships, Amateur
3rd Premier Calendar
1973
1st Tour of Ireland
1st Girvan 3 day
1st Stage 1, Girvan 3 day
1st Stage 3, Girvan 3 day
1st Mersey Roads Two Day
1976
1st  British National Road Race Championships, Amateur
1977
3rd Girvan 3 day
1979
2nd Girvan 3 day

References

1944 births
Living people
English male cyclists
British cycling road race champions
Members of the Order of the British Empire
Sportspeople from Liverpool